Chris Hillcoat (born 3 October 1969) is a Scottish football player and coach, who spent all of his senior playing career at Hamilton Academical. Towards the end of his playing career, Hillcoat became the player/manager of Hamilton. He left the club in May 2003, after former Clyde owner Ronnie Macdonald took control of the club. Hillcoat then moved to Clyde as a youth team coach, a position he vacated in December 2004 for business reasons. In February 2014, Hillcoat was appointed to the coaching staff of Queen's Park.

References

External links

1969 births
Living people
Footballers from Glasgow
Association football fullbacks
Scottish footballers
Hamilton Academical F.C. players
Scottish Football League players
Scottish football managers
Hamilton Academical F.C. managers
Scottish Football League managers